Mystery of the White Room is a 1939 American mystery film directed by Otis Garrett and starring Bruce Cabot, Helen Mack and Joan Woodbury. A surgeon is killed during the middle of an operation when the hospital room is thrown into darkness. The police investigate to find out who is behind the murder.

Cast
 Bruce Cabot as Dr. Bob Clayton 
 Helen Mack as Carole Dale 
 Joan Woodbury as Lila Haines 
 Constance Worth as Ann Stokes 
 Thomas E. Jackson as Sergeant Macintosh Spencer 
 Tom Dugan as Hank Manley 
 Mabel Todd as Dora Stanley 
 Roland Drew as Dr. Norman Kennedy 
 Addison Richards as Dr. Finley Morton 
 Frank Reicher as Dr. Amos Thornton 
 Frank Puglia as Tony 
 Don Porter as Dr. Donald Fox

References

Bibliography
 Tom Weaver & John Brunas. Universal Horrors: The Studio’s Classic Films, 1931–1946. McFarland, 2011.

External links
 

1939 films
1939 mystery films
American mystery films
Universal Pictures films
Films directed by Otis Garrett
American black-and-white films
1930s English-language films
1930s American films